"It's a Disco Night (Rock Don't Stop)" is a 1979 club hit for The Isley Brothers, released on their T-Neck label as the second single from their gold-certified album, Winner Takes All. The song is notable for being one of the few disco-based songs the Isley Brothers released. Beforehand, the group were known for their mixture of funk, rhythm and blues and rock. The song was led by brother Ronald Isley while his brothers Kelly and Rudolph Isley chanted "rock don't stop" in the background. The song briefly charted on the Billboard Hot 100 peaking at number 90, hitting number 27 on the R&B chart. Outside the US, "It's a Disco Night" reached number 14 on the UK Singles chart.

Chart positions

Credits
Unless otherwise noted, information is based on Liner notes.
Performance
Lead vocals by Rudolph Isley and Ronald Isley
Background vocals by  O'Kelly Isley Jr., Ronald Isley and Rudolph Isley
Guitar, drums, congas and percussion by Ernie Isley
Bass, percussion and background vocals by Marvin Isley
Keyboards, congas and percussion by Chris Jasper

Technical
George Carnell - Assistant engineer 
John Holbrook - Recording engineer, synthesizer programming

References

Songs about disco
1979 singles
Disco songs
The Isley Brothers songs
Songs about dancing
T-Neck Records singles
Songs written by Ernie Isley
Songs written by Marvin Isley
Songs written by Chris Jasper
Songs written by Rudolph Isley
Songs written by O'Kelly Isley Jr.
Songs written by Ronald Isley